Brigadier General Abdul Raheem Abdul Latheef is a General Officer of the MNDF. He was appointed vice chief of the Maldives National Defence Force on 11 December 2018.

References 

1964 births
Living people
Maldivian military personnel